Psychotria petitii is a species of plant in the family Rubiaceae. It is endemic to Taita Hills in Kenya and threatened by habitat loss.

References

petitii
Endemic flora of Kenya
Endangered flora of Africa
Taxonomy articles created by Polbot